Donald Ray Hardeman (August 13, 1952 – June 2, 2016) was an American football running back in the National Football League. He has 5 sons, Don Hardeman Jr. (Hou), Eric Hardeman (Hou), Cedric Hardeman (Hou), Demetrius Hardeman (DC) and David Hardeman (NY). 

Hardeman played five seasons with the Houston Oilers and the Baltimore Colts. In his short career, he scored eleven rushing touchdowns and caught two more. He rushed for 1,460 yards on 397 attempts and caught 58 passes for 285 yards. He was drafted in the first round of the 1975 NFL Draft by the Oilers and attended Texas A&I University.  He attended Killeen High School in Killeen, Texas. He died in Temple, Texas in 2016.

References

External links
Player profile and statistics at NFL.com

1952 births
2016 deaths
Sportspeople from Killeen, Texas
Players of American football from Texas
American football running backs
Texas A&M–Kingsville Javelinas football players
Houston Oilers players
Baltimore Colts players
Texas A&I University alumni